Lincoln St. Marks is a closed railway station on the Nottingham to Lincoln Line.

History
St. Mark's railway station, the first in Lincoln, was opened by the Midland Railway in 1846. It was originally a terminus; the line was extended through the station only a few years after it opened, to connect with the Great Northern Railway just to the east of that company's Lincoln Central station. The Durham Ox Junction was also crossed by a road, leading to many delays. The junction was crossed by Pelham Bridge in the mid-1950s. Until its closure St. Marks was the mainline station, with through services from Cleethorpes to London King's Cross. Prior to closure of the Lincoln-to-Grantham line during the Beeching Axe, London services had used Lincoln Central.

To avoid unnecessarily operating two stations, St Marks closed in 1985; services were diverted to the nearby Lincoln Central. The construction of a new 80-metre length of track to the west allowed services from Newark Castle station to reach Lincoln Central. The grand ionic portico that was once the entrance has been preserved and, as of January 2007, was home to Lakeland Limited as part of the commercial development of the site. A mock signalbox has also been erected in the car park on which has been affixed an original sign from the station. The remainder of the former station site is now St. Marks Shopping Centre. The redevelopment, in keeping with the preserved buildings, won an Ian Allan Heritage Award in 2009, which is commemorated by a plaque.

Stationmasters
From 1934 the position of station master was merged with that of the LNER station and E.O. Wright assumed responsibility.   

Joseph Hawkins ca. 1849 - 1870 (afterwards station master at Burton) 
Thomas Warwick 1870 - 1876 (formerly station master at Keighley)
Joseph Somers 1876 - 1896 
William H. Buxton 1896 - 1919 (formerly station master at Belper)
Amos Follows 1919 - 1927 (afterwards station master at Nottingham)
William Hardy 1927 - 1930 (formerly station master at Gloucester, afterwards station master at Bradford Forster Square)
W. Lowis 1930 - 1932 (afterwards station master at Leicester)
Frederick James Stallard 1932 - 1934 (formerly station master at Evesham, afterwards station master at Low Moor, Bradford)

References

 Lincoln St, Marks at Subterranea Britannica
 Farewell to St. Marks

Disused railway stations in Lincolnshire
Railway stations in Great Britain opened in 1846
Railway stations in Great Britain closed in 1985
History of Lincoln, England
Former Midland Railway stations
1846 establishments in England
1985 disestablishments in England